John Anthony "Tony" Read (born 5 July 1942 in Haydock, Lancashire) is an English former footballer, most noted as a player for Luton Town.

Playing career

After failing to make the grade at Sheffield Wednesday, goalkeeper Read signed for Peterborough United. After only two appearances, he was on the move again, as he signed for Luton Town in March 1965.

Read arrived at Luton with a broken foot, and after a spree of goalscoring in the reserves, Read finally arrived in the Luton first team during the 1965–66 season—as a forward. Read scored 12 goals in 20 starts, even including a hat-trick against Notts County, but his rich vein of form soon dried up and he returned to his position between the posts.

Reid was a regular for the next six years and a firm fans' favourite at Kenilworth Road, but in 1972 he decided to hang up his gloves.

References

1942 births
English Football League players
Living people
English footballers
Peterborough United F.C. players
Luton Town F.C. players
People from Haydock
Association football forwards
Association football goalkeepers